The Sixth Gun is a monthly comic book series created by Cullen Bunn and Brian Hurtt and published by Oni Press.

Summary
The Sixth Gun takes place in the old west during the late 1880s. The story centers around a set of six pistols, each imbued with dark powers. The wielder of each pistol gains an ability unique to the weapon, and is tied to the pistol until their death. The main protagonists, Becky Montcrief and Drake Sinclair attempt to collect the Six and learn their secrets. Antagonists in the series include General Hume and his four horsemen, the Knights of Solomon, the Sword of Abraham, and the Grey Witch.

Cold Dead Fingers
Drake Sinclair searches for the Sixth Gun, which he believes will grant him access to General Hume's vault, which is rumored to be filled with treasures Hume had amassed during the Civil War. His search leads him to a young woman, Becky Montcrief, who is bound to the Sixth Gun after its former owner is killed. They are pursued by General Hume, and his four horsemen and his wife Missy Hume, each of which carries one of the Six Guns.

As Becky and Drake head to the Maw, where Hume's vault awaits, Drake manages to pick off Hume's four horsemen one by one and claim their guns for himself. At the Maw, the meet Gord Cantrell, who is also trying to gain access to Hume's vault. However, Becky realizes the vault does not contain treasure, but rather unlocks some dark power. It requires all of the Six Guns to unlock.

In a battle at the Maw, General Hume is defeated, but Missy Hume escapes.

Crossroads
Drake, Becky, and Gord try to uncover the secrets of the Six while various agents try to claim the Six for themselves. In the process, they make allies with the Sword of Abraham. Gord discovers the Six may unlock the power to remake the world.

Bound
While trying to transport Hume's corpse to a secure location so that he won't be resurrected, the Sword of Abraham is attacked by undead horsemen sent by Missy Hume. Drake is thrown from a train and separated from the others.

After the attack, Becky is taken to the secure location for Hume's corpse, only to learn she will be imprisoned there too so that no one can get the Sixth Gun from her. By tapping into the powers of her gun, Becky is able to escape.

Gord returns to the now deserted estate where he had once been a slave and learns how the Six where summoned into the world.

A Town Called Penance
Becky's search for Drake leads her to a town called Penance. She gradually learns that the people in the town are unable to leave and are kept so that they can be human sacrifices for the Knights of Solomon.

In a hideout of the Knights of Solomon, hidden beneath Penance, Drake is interrogated and tortured. Becky manages to rescue him, but during their escape, they discover a mosaic mural depicting Drake as a Medieval knight.

Winter Wolves
A wendigo captures Becky and Drake in the Spirit World. Drake suspects he has lived other lives and that the world has not only been remade before, but remade many times. The two manage to escape from the Spirit World, but Becky also unlocks some of the deeper powers of the Sixth Gun, and she feels it is beginning to transform her.

Ghost Dance
Becky is half stuck in the Spirit World after using the Sixth Gun. Drake takes her to a shaman who tries to guide Becky back. In the Spirit World, Becky walks the Winding Way, a path that cuts through all of creation. She sees the different realities the Six have made, and others that may be. She sees Drake in different lives as he seeks to destroy the Six, the most ancient of which is a caveman, back when the Six were clubs.

From inside the Winding Way, Becky is attacked by shamans sent by Missy Hume, but she manages to escape. General Hume's mother, the Grey Witch, tires of Missy Hume's failures, and murders her.

Not the Bullet, But the Fall
The Grey Witch attacks with all her strength and manages to kill all of Becky and Drake's allies and claim the Six.

The Grey Witch
In a flashback, we learn that the Grey Witch serves the Great Wyrms, ancient creatures from the dawn of time. They caused humans untold suffering, and it was this suffering that first called the Six into existence. The first time the humans remade the world, they tried to remake the world without the Great Wyrms, but they had managed to burrow themselves deep into the roots of creation. Each time the world is remade, they fade from it a little more, but since humanity no longer remembers them, the recreation of the world is too inarticulate to precisely weed them out entirely. The Grey Witch seeks to remake a world with the Great Wyrms returned to their former strength.

Hell and High Water
The Grey Witch begins to recreate the world. Becky and Drake pursue her into the Devil's Workshop.

Boot Hill
Drake realizes it was he that remade the world the first time and ever since he has been bound to the Six, recalled to life every time the Six are summoned back into existence. Everytime the world has been remade, it is corrupted by the selfish desires of the person remaking it. The last time the world was remade, Drake attempted to make something that could undo the power of the Six—he created Becky. In the final battle, Becky takes hold of creation and remakes the world one last time. To prevent the world being corrupted by her own desires, she unmakes herself in the process.

Publication History

Issues

Spinoffs

The Sixth Gun: Sons of the Gun
A five-issue spinoff featuring General Hume's horsemen: Bill Sumter, Ben Kinney, Will Arcene, and Silas Hedgepeth.

The Sixth Gun: Days of the Dead
A five-issue spinoff featuring Brother Roberto Vargas and Jesup Sutter.

The Sixth Gun: Dust to Dust
A three-issue spinoff miniseries featuring Billjohn O'Henry.

The Sixth Gun: Valley of Death
A three-issue spinoff miniseries.

Shadow Roads

Trade Paperback Collections
The Sixth Gun and Shadow Roads have been collected into the following trade paperbacks:

Hardcover Collections
There are six hardcover collections, available in both a "Deluxe Edition" (the standard version) and a "Gunslinger Edition" (a limited print version). These collect all fifty issues of the regular series, plus all the spinoffs. The first Gunslinger volume was limited to 1000 copies, whereas subsequent volumes were limited to 500.

Critical reception

Awards
Through 2012, The Sixth Gun has been nominated for two Eisner Awards and three Harvey Awards.

Adaptations

Television pilot
On July 22, 2011, it was announced that The Sixth Gun would be adapted into a six-part mini-series to air on the SyFy channel, however this did not come to fruition.

In 2013, NBC ordered a pilot based on The Sixth Gun, and Laura Ramsey, W. Earl Brown, Graham McTavish and Aldis Hodge were cast. Additional cast included Michiel Huisman as Drake Sinclair, Pedro Pascal as Agent Ortega and Elena Satine as Missy Hume. On May 8, 2013, The Hollywood Reporter reported that NBC had passed on the series.

Roleplaying Game
In 2015, Pinnacle Entertainment Group published the official role-playing game based on The Sixth Gun utilizing the Savage Worlds rules system. The core rulebook is written by Scott Alan Woodard.

References

2010 comics debuts
Comics by Cullen Bunn
Fantasy Westerns
Oni Press titles
Western (genre) comics